Mohamad Hassan Hammoud (born 1 May 1987) is a Lebanese footballer who plays as a full-back for  club Bourj.

Club career 
Starting his career at Olympic Beirut, Hammoud moved to Ansar in 2006, representing the club at the 2008 AFC Cup, before joining Safa in 2014. After two seasons, Hammoud joined rivals Akhaa Ahli Aley, staying at the club for two seasons, before moving to Shabab Sahel in 2018. On 17 July 2022, Hammoud joined Bourj on a free transfer.

International career 
Between 2011 and 2015, Hammoud represented the Lebanon national team seven times, taking part in the 2014 FIFA World Cup qualifiers.

Honours 
Olympic Beirut
 Lebanese FA Cup runner-up: 2004–05

Ansar
 Lebanese Premier League: 2006–07
 Lebanese FA Cup: 2006–07, 2009–10, 2011–12
 Lebanese Super Cup: 2012; runner-up: 2010
 Lebanese Elite Cup runner-up: 2008, 2010

Safa
 Lebanese Premier League: 2015–16
 Lebanese Elite Cup runner-up: 2014, 2015

Shabab Sahel
 Lebanese Elite Cup: 2019

References

External links 

 
 
 
 

1987 births
Living people
People from Matn District
Lebanese footballers
Association football fullbacks
Olympic Beirut players
Al Ansar FC players
Safa SC players
Akhaa Ahli Aley FC players
Shabab Al Sahel FC players
Bourj FC players
Lebanese Premier League players
Lebanon youth international footballers
Lebanon international footballers